Encañada District is one of twelve districts of the Cajamarca Province in Peru.

Geography 
Other mountains are listed below:

See also
 Mamaqucha

References